"Might Not" is a song by Palestinian-Canadian rapper Belly featuring Canadian singer the Weeknd. The song was released on December 18, 2015, by Roc Nation and XO as a single from the former's mixtape Up For Days. Produced by Ben Billions, it reached number 68 on the US Billboard Hot 100. The official remix features new material from American rappers 2 Chainz and Yo Gotti.

Composition
It is a hip hop and trap song in the key of  C minor.

Music video
The music video for "Might Not" premiered on December 18, 2015, on Belly's Vevo account on YouTube. It was directed by Shomi Patwary and Belly and since its release, has received over 70 million views on YouTube. The music video stars Belly and the Weeknd getting intoxicated at a party with the excessive intake of pills and booze, which leads to heavily hallucinations to the point where they feel they might not make it.

Commercial performance
"Might Not" peaked at number 68 on the Billboard Hot 100 on the date ending April 30, 2016, making it his highest entry on the chart as the leading artist.
The single was certified Platinum by the Recording Industry Association of America (RIAA) for combined sales and streaming equivalent units of over 1,000,000 units in the United States.

Charts

Year-end charts

Certifications

See also
List of Billboard Rhythmic number-one songs of the 2010s

References

2015 songs
2015 singles
Belly (rapper) songs
The Weeknd songs
Roc Nation singles
Songs written by Belly (rapper)
Songs written by the Weeknd
Songs written by Ben Billions
XO (record label) singles